Chalakpur is a village in Saharanpur district, Uttar Pradesh. Its postal code is 247231. It is 13 km away from Saharanpur  5 km from Sarsawa 3 km from ChilkanasultanPur  13 km from YamunaNagar 67 km From Ambala

References 

Villages in Saharanpur district